Athaumaspis is a genus of Asian bush crickets belonging to the tribe Meconematini in the subfamily Meconematinae. The genus was erected by Wang et al. after a revision of the genus Thaumaspis; species are found in Tibet, China, and Vietnam.

Species 
The Orthoptera Species File lists the following species:
 Athaumaspis bifurcatus (Liu, Zhou & Bi, 2010) - Fengyangshan National Nature Reserve, Zhejiang, China
 Athaumaspis minutus Wang & Liu, 2014 - type species locality: Mount Lang Bian, Vietnam
 Athaumaspis tibetanus Wang & Liu, 2014 - Tibet

References

External links

Tettigoniidae genera
Meconematinae
Orthoptera of Asia